

Albums

Studio albums

Compilation albums

Singles

As lead artist

References

External links
  
 

Discographies of Swiss artists